The 1998 Idaho gubernatorial election was held on November 3, 1998 to elect the Governor of Idaho. Phil Batt, the Republican incumbent, chose not to run for a second term. The Republican nominee, United States Senator Dirk Kempthorne, handily defeated the Democratic nominee, former Idaho Supreme Court justice Robert C. Huntley, to keep the seat in GOP hands.

Republican primary

Candidates
Dirk Kempthorne, U.S. Senator
David W. Sheperd, perennial candidate

Results

Democratic primary

Candidates
 Jack Wayne Chappell
 Robert C. Huntley, former Idaho Supreme Court Justice, former Idaho State Representative, former Pocatello city councilman
 Donald McMurrian
 William Tarnasky

Results

General election
Given the lack of a high-profile candidate on the Democratic side, throughout the campaign many considered Kempthorne's election a foregone conclusion. Indeed, Huntley's performance was well below that of the 1994 Democratic nominee Larry EchoHawk. In addition, Peter Rickards, a podiatrist and anti-nuclear waste advocate from Twin Falls, siphoned off progressive votes that would have otherwise gone to the Democratic candidate.

See also
Governor of Idaho
List of governors of Idaho
Idaho gubernatorial elections

References

External links
Idaho General Election Results November 3, 1998

Gubernatorial
1998
1998 United States gubernatorial elections